is a form of yose, which is itself a form of Japanese verbal entertainment. The story always involves the dialogue of two or more characters. The difference between the characters is depicted only through change in pitch, tone, and a slight turn of the head.

Lexical background
The oldest appearance of the kanji which refers specifically to this type of performance dates back to 1787, but at the time the characters themselves (落とし噺) were normally read as otoshibanashi (falling discourse).

In the middle of the Meiji period (1868–1912) the expression rakugo first started being used, and it came into common usage only in the Shōwa period (1926–1989).

Description
The speaker is in the middle of the audience, and his purpose is to stimulate the general hilarity with tone and limited, yet specific body gestures. Twelve kinds of ochi are codified and recognized, with more complex variations having evolved through time from the more basic forms.

In many of these forms the ochi, which is essential to the original rakugo, is absent.

Rakugo has been described as "a sitcom with one person playing all the parts" by Noriko Watanabe, assistant professor in the Department of Modern Languages and Comparative Literature at Baruch College.

History

One of the predecessors of rakugo is considered to be a humorous story in setsuwa. The Konjaku Monogatarishū and the Uji Shūi Monogatari were setsuwa collections compiled from the Heian period (794–1185) to the Kamakura period (1185–1333); they contained many funny stories, and Japanese Buddhist monks preached Buddhism by quoting them. In Makura no Sōshi, it is described that the monks had gained a reputation for their beautiful voices and narrative arts.

The direct ancestor of rakugo is a humorous story among the stories narrated by otogishū in the Sengoku Period (1467–1615) . Otogishū were scholars, Buddhist monks and tea masters who served daimyo (feudal lord), and their duty was to give lectures on books to daimyo and to be a partner for chatting. Anrakuan Sakuden, who was an otogishū and a monk of the Jōdo-shū, is often said to be the originator of rakugo, and his 8 volumes of Seisui Sho contain 1000 stories, including the original stories of rakugo.

Around 1670 in the Edo period (1603–1867), three storytellers appeared who were regarded as the first rakugoka. Tsuyuno Gorobe in Kyoto, Yonezawa Hikohachi in Osaka, and Shikano Buzaemon in Edo built simple huts around the same age and began telling funny stories to the general public for a price. Rakugo in this period was called Tsujibanashi, but once it lost popularity, rakugo declined for about 100 years.

In 1786, Utei Enba presided over a rakugo show at a ryōtei (traditional Japanese restaurant) in Mukōjima. He is regarded as the father of the restoration of rakugo. His performances led to the establishment of the first theater dedicated to rakugo (yose) by Sanshōtei Karaku and Sanyūtei Enshō, and the revival of rakugo.

During the Edo period, thanks to the emergence of the merchant class of the chōnin, the rakugo spread to the lower classes. Many groups of performers were formed, and collections of texts were finally printed.

Before the advent of modern rakugo there were the : short comical vignettes ending with an ochi, popular between the 17th and the 19th centuries. These were enacted in small public venues, or in the streets, and printed and sold as pamphlets. The origin of kobanashi is to be found in the Kinō wa kyō no monogatari (Yesterday Stories Told Today, c. 1620), the work of an unknown author collecting approximately 230 stories describing the common class.

Important contributors

Many artists contributed to the development of rakugo. Some were simply performers, but many also composed original works.

Among the more famous rakugoka of the Tokugawa period were performers like Anrakuan Sakuden (1554–1642), the author of the Seisuishō (Laughter to Chase Away Sleep, 1628), a collection of more than 1,000 stories.  In Edo (today's Tokyo) there also lived  (1649–99) who wrote the Shikano Buzaemon kudenbanashi (Oral Instruction Discourses of Shikano Buzaemon) and the Shika no makifude (The Deer's Brush, 1686), a work containing 39 stories, eleven of which are about the kabuki milieu.  (1743–1822) was author of the Rakugo rokugi (The Six Meanings of Rakugo).

His works are included in the Karukuchi tsuyu ga hanashi (Jocular Tsuyu's Stories, date of composition unknown), containing many word games, episodes from the lives of famous literary authors, and plays on the different dialects from the Tokyo, Osaka, and Kyoto areas.

An example from Yonezawa Hikohachi's collection:

For the poor man is already dead.  The joke becomes clearer when one notes that a Japanese traditional bathing tub is shaped like a coffin.

Current performers
Current rakugo artists include Tachibanaya Enzō, Katsura Bunshi VI, Tachibanaya Takezō II, Tatekawa Shinosuke and Hayashiya Shōzō (9th). Furthermore, many people regarded as more mainstream comedians originally trained as rakugoka apprentices, even adopting stage names given them by their masters.  Some examples include Akashiya Sanma, Shōfukutei Tsurube II, and Shōfukutei Shōhei. Another famous rakugo performer, Shijaku Katsura II, was known outside Japan for his performances of rakugo in English.

Titles
  - a kaidanbanashi, or ghost story
  - the life of a boy with a ridiculously long name
  - a group of boys try to scare off a boaster
  - a naive lord enjoys commoners' foods
  - a meta-gag in which a father is mocked by his son because of his bad storytelling of the Japanese folktale Momotarō
  - a tree begins growing out of a man's head
  - a man tries to outwit the owner of a piece of antique porcelain
  - a good-for-nothing husband finds a huge sum of money
  - cash reward to whom that could identify a strange fish

Notable rakugoka

Edo (Tokyo)

Kamigata (Osaka)

See also
Akane-banashi
Descending Stories: Showa Genroku Rakugo Shinju
Fallen Words
Kyōgen
Manzai
Stand-up comedy

References

Further reading 

 Brau, Lorie. Rakugo: Performing Comedy and Cultural Heritage in Contemporary Tokyo. Lanham, MD: Lexington Books, 2008.
 McArthur, Ian. Henry Black: On Stage in Meiji Japan. Clayton: Monash University Publishing, 2013.
 Morioka, Heinz, and Miyoko Sasaki. Rakugo: The Popular Narrative Art of Japan. Cambridge, MA: Harvard University Asia Center, 1990.
 Shores, M.W. The Comic Storytelling of Western Japan: Satire and Social Mobility in Kamigata Rakugo. Cambridge: Cambridge University Press, 2021.

External links 

 YouTube Rakugo examples
 Rakugo video (in English) SFGTV San Francisco
 Short newspaper essay on differences between Kamigata (Osaka) and Edo (Tokyo) rakugo
 Learning Japanese Language and Culture through Rakugo Appreciation
 The Conversation article about rakugo and gender

 
Japanese literature
Theatre in Japan
Japanese folk art
Japanese comedy
Performing arts in Japan